Kseniya Vladimirovna Makeyeva (born 19 September 1990) is a Russian handball player for Rostov-Don and the Russian national team.

Achievements
Romanian Championship:
Finalist: 2015
Romanian Cup:
Winner: 2015
Supercupa României:
Winner: 2014
Russian Championship:
Winner: 2009, 2010, 2011, 2012, 2013, 2014
Bronze Medalist: 2007, 2008
EHF Cup:
Winner: 2008
Semifinalist: 2009
EHF Cup Winners' Cup:
Semifinalist: 2012
World Championship:
Gold Medalist: 2009
Junior World Championship:
Silver Medalist: 2010
Youth World Championship:
Gold Medalist: 2008

Individual awards
 All-Star Line Player of the Junior World Championship: 2010

References

External links

1990 births
Living people
Sportspeople from Ufa
Russian female handball players
Expatriate handball players
Russian expatriate sportspeople in Romania
CS Minaur Baia Mare (women's handball) players
Universiade medalists in handball
Universiade gold medalists for Russia
Handball players at the 2020 Summer Olympics
Medalists at the 2020 Summer Olympics
Olympic medalists in handball
Olympic silver medalists for the Russian Olympic Committee athletes